Liu Liange (born May 1961) is a Chinese banker who is the current chairman the board of the Bank of China, in office since June 2019. He previously served as president of the Bank of China and before that, president of the Exim Bank of China.

Biography
Liu was born in Yongji County, Jilin, in May 1961. In 1982, he was accepted to Jilin Institute of Finance and Trade (now Jilin University of Finance and Economics), majoring in finance.

After graduation, he was assigned to the People's Bank of China and spent 20 years at the bank. He served in several posts in the bank, including chief representative of the People's Bank of China Representative Office in Europe (London, UK), deputy director general of the International Department, president of Fuzhou Branch, and director of the Anti Money Laundering Bureau (Security Bureau).

In March 2007, he became vice president of the Exim Bank of China, rising to president in February 2015. In June 2018, he became president and vice chairman of the Bank of China, and was elevated to chairman and party secretary the board of the Bank of China the next year.

References

1961 births
Living people
People from Yongji County, Jilin
Jilin University of Finance and Economics alumni
Chinese bankers